"Intruder" is a song written and performed by English musician Peter Gabriel. The song was the first to use the "gated reverb" drum sound created by Hugh Padgham and Phil Collins, with Collins performing the song's drum part. The gated drum effect was later used in Collins' own "In the Air Tonight", and appeared frequently through the 1980s, on records such as David Bowie's "Let's Dance" and The Power Station's "Some Like It Hot".

Recording
The gated drum sound - which features heavily throughout the song - was stumbled upon by accident by Hugh Padgham when working with an early SSL Console at The Townhouse, which had noise gates and compressors built into every channel. It was due to a reverse talkback mic, which had heavy compression - the unbelievable sound came out when Collins was playing drums once he’d been talking.

Other versions
The song was often performed live by Gabriel in the early '80s, and is included on his first live album, Plays Live. It appears also on New Blood in symphonic version.

In 1992, the band Primus recorded a cover of the song and included it as the opening track to their Miscellaneous Debris EP.

In 2013, American industrial rock band Iron Lung Corp recorded a version of the song that appeared as the first track on the Body Snatchers covers album.

Personnel
Peter Gabriel – piano, lead and backing vocals, whistling
Phil Collins – drums, drum pattern
Morris Pert – xylophone, bell
Larry Fast – synthesizers
David Rhodes – guitar, backing vocals

References

1980 songs
Experimental rock songs
Peter Gabriel songs
Songs written by Peter Gabriel
Song recordings produced by Steve Lillywhite